Franklin B. Jenkins House may refer to:

 Franklin B. Jenkins House (35 Chestnut Street, Stoneham, Massachusetts), listed on the NRHP in Massachusetts
 Franklin B. Jenkins House (2 Middle Street, Stoneham, Massachusetts), listed on the NRHP in Massachusetts